Sand-e Bahram (also Romanized as Sand-e Bahrām) is a village in Sand-e Mir Suiyan Rural District, Dashtiari District, Chabahar County, Sistan and Baluchestan Province, Iran. At the 2006 census, its population was 400, in 57 families.

References 

Populated places in Chabahar County